West Liberty is an unincorporated community in Jay County, Indiana, in the United States.

The first post office at West Liberty was established in 1851.

References

Unincorporated communities in Jay County, Indiana
1851 establishments in Indiana
Unincorporated communities in Indiana